Dark Matter is the 11th studio album of original material and first of such in nine years by Randy Newman, released on August 4, 2017, by Nonesuch Records. NPR.org released an advance stream of the album on July 27, 2017. Veteran music critic Robert Christgau ranked it as the sixth-best album of the 2010s.

Track listing

Accolades

Personnel
 Randy Newman – piano, vocals
 Matt Chamberlain – drums
 David Piltch – bass
 Blake Mills – guitar
 Mitchell Froom – additional keyboards

Charts

Weekly charts

Year-end charts

References

2017 albums
Randy Newman albums
Albums produced by Mitchell Froom
Albums produced by Lenny Waronker
Nonesuch Records albums